Sheldon A. Ilowite (February 19, 1931 – March 13, 2022) was an American author of juvenile novels about ice hockey. He was a former ice hockey coach.

Ilowite was born in New York to Arthur Ilowite and Mae Terdeman. His father and his maternal grandparents were Romanian immigrants.

Bibliography
Fury on Ice
Hockey Defenceman
Centerman From Quebec
Penalty Killer
On the Wing: Rod Gilbert, a biography of Rod Gilbert

References 

1931 births
Living people
20th-century American Jews
American people of Romanian-Jewish descent
American male novelists
Ice hockey mass media
People from Jericho, New York
Writers from New York City
21st-century American Jews